Aleksandr Yakovlevich Bereznyak ( – 7 July 1974) was a Soviet aircraft and missile designer. He was the Chief Designer of MKB Raduga, from March 1957.

Biography 
Aleksandr Bereznyak was born on 29 December 1912 in Boyarkino, Ozyorsky District, Moscow Oblast.

He was employed in aviation industries since 1931. Bereznyak was a graduate of the Moscow Aviation Institute named after Ordzhonikidze (1938). He was an engineer in the experimental design bureau of V. F. Bolkhovitinov. While working in the bureau, he designed the first soviet jet, the BI-1, which was equipped with liquid fuel to power a rocket engine. The BI-1 was created in 1942 in co-operation with A. M. Isaev). He became Vice-chief designer of OKB-2 in 1946, later to become the chief designer in 1957. Other his developments include:
 BI-1 — an early rocket-powered aircraft and the world's first rocket fighter developed by Bereznyak and Isaev in 1940-1944. It flew after German's experimental He 176, but still was the first Soviet rocket plane. Eight test planes (usually referred as BI-1 — BI-8) were built.
 302P
 346 — experimental, trans-sonic speed, 1946.
 468 — jet, project, 1948..1949.

In March 1957 he was assigned to lead the newly established MKB Raduga in the village of Ivankovo near the town of Dubna. This had started in 1951 as Branch 2 of Artem Mikoyan's OKB-155 to produce the KS-1 Kometa AShM. Raduga specialized in a range of tactical missiles.

Bereznyak was a Doctor in Engineering (1968) and a Merited engineering scientist of the RSFSR (1973). He became a member of the CPSU in 1932.  He was later awarded with the Lenin Prize, the USSR State Prize, the Order of Lenin, the Order of the October Revolution, the Order of the Red Banner of Labour, and numerous medals. 

Aleksandr Bereznyak died on 7 July 1974 in Dubna, Moscow Oblast.

See also 
 List of Russian inventors

Sources

References
 Great Soviet Encyclopedia, Vol.30, 3rd edition, Moscow, 1978, p. 579.
 Aleksandr Bereznyak

1912 births
1974 deaths
Moscow Aviation Institute alumni
Lenin Prize winners
Recipients of the Order of Lenin
Recipients of the Order of the Red Banner of Labour
Recipients of the USSR State Prize
Aircraft manufacturers of the Soviet Union
Soviet aerospace engineers
Soviet inventors
Soviet scientists
Burials at Vvedenskoye Cemetery